Abroscelis longipes is a species of tiger beetle in the genus Abroscelis.

References

Cicindelidae
Beetles described in 1798